Our Daily Bread is an East German film. It was first released in 1949. The film was released in USA in October 1950.

References

External links
 

1949 films
East German films
1940s German-language films
Films set in Berlin
German black-and-white films
Films directed by Slatan Dudow
1940s German films